Crashing Through may refer to:
 Crashing Through (album), a 2002 box set by Beat Happening
 Crashing Through (film), a 1928 American silent Western film

See also
 Crashing Thru (disambiguation)